Neville Hugo Sale Judd  (27 December 1939 – 2 May 2017) was a New Zealand diplomat and public servant.

Early life and family
Born in Victoria, British Columbia, Canada, on 27 December 1939, Judd was the son of Edwin Judd and Violet Judd (née Sale). After emigrating to New Zealand in 1946, he was educated in Christchurch at Cathedral Grammar School, and then Christ's College. He went on to study at Canterbury University College, graduating BA in 1961, and the University of Oxford, where he completed a second BA in 1963. While at Oxford he was awarded a blue for gymnastics.

Judd became a naturalised New Zealand citizen in 1957. In 1973 he married Catherine Isaac, and the couple had three sons. They later divorced and Judd married Sue Morgan.

Career
In 1964 Judd joined the Ministry of External Affairs. In 1965 he was employed in the external economic division of the Treasury. From 1966 to 1968 he served at the New Zealand Mission to the United Nations in Geneva, and then, from 1968 to 1971, at New Zealand's embassy in Saigon. He then returned to New Zealand and worked in the economic division of the Ministry of Foreign Affairs from 1971 to 1973, before taking another overseas posting as New Zealand's chargé d'affaires in Moscow. Between 1975 and 1978 Judd was director of administration at the Ministry of Foreign Affairs. From 1978 to 1982 he was minister at the New Zealand embassy in Washington, D.C., and between 1982 and 1985 he served as New Zealand's ambassador to Austria, with accreditation in Hungary, Poland, Czechoslovakia, East Germany, and Romania. In 1986 he was appointed spokesman and assistant secretary at the Ministry of External Relations and Trade.

Judd served as the official secretary to the Governor-General of New Zealand from 1994 until his retirement in 2004.

Honours
Judd was appointed a Commander of the Royal Victorian Order in 1995. In the 2008 New Year Honours Judd was appointed a Companion of the Queen's Service Order for public services.

Later life and death
Judd moved to Nelson in October 2004, and served as a member of the Bishop Suter Art Gallery Trust Board. He died at his home in Māpua near Nelson on 2 May 2017.

References

1939 births
2017 deaths
People from Victoria, British Columbia
Canadian emigrants to New Zealand
People educated at Christ's College, Christchurch
University of Canterbury alumni
Alumni of the University of Oxford
Ambassadors of New Zealand to Austria
New Zealand Commanders of the Royal Victorian Order
Companions of the Queen's Service Order
New Zealand public servants